Pennsylvania elected its members October 10, 1820.

See also 
 1820 Pennsylvania's 5th congressional district special election
 1820 Pennsylvania's 7th congressional district special election
 1821 Pennsylvania's 5th congressional district special election
 1821 Pennsylvania's 10th congressional district special election
 1820 and 1821 United States House of Representatives elections
 List of United States representatives from Pennsylvania

Notes

References 

1820
Pennsylvania
United States House of Representatives